The Challenger Sale is the first non-fiction book by Matthew Dixon, Brent Adamson, and their colleagues at CEB Inc. The book was published on November 10, 2011 by Portfolio/Penguin. In the text, the book argues that relationship-building is no longer the best sales method. To sell complex, large-scale business-to-business solutions, customers are changing how they buy so sales people must change how they sell. The authors’ study found that sales reps fall into one of five profiles, and the challenger seller is the highest performer.

Reception
This book has been an Amazon best-seller in the Sales and Selling category.

Translated Book 
 Брент Адамсон, Метью Діксон. Суперпродавці. Як навчитися продавати / пер. Дмитро Кожедуб. — К.: Наш Формат, 2018. — 240 с. — .

References

External links
 Book Publisher website 
 Challenger — Change your point of view to change your potential 
 [https://www.dcminsights.com/leadership - Matthew Dixon. The Customer Understanding Lab 
 Linkedin - Brent Adamson. linkedin.com 
 The Challenger Sale: Taking Control of the Customer Conversation 

2011 non-fiction books
Business books
Portfolio (publisher) books
www.dcminsights.com